The 2020 Vancouver International Film Festival, the 39th event in the history of the Vancouver International Film Festival, was held from September 24 to October 7, 2020. On September 3, organizers announced a lineup of 180 films; due to the COVID-19 pandemic in British Columbia and the associated social distancing restrictions remaining in place at movie theatres and other public venues, the festival took place primarily on the online VIFF Connect platform.

Most films were geoblocked so that they were available for streaming only to viewers in British Columbia, although some of the festival's other programming, including its VIFF Talks series, was made available to viewers across Canada and internationally.

Awards
Audience-voted awards were announced at the end of the festival on October 7; however, some of the juried award winners were announced during the festival, beginning with the announcement of the British Columbia film categories on September 27, as a technique to help publicize and promote the winning films.

Films

Contemporary World Cinema
Another Round (Druk) — Thomas Vinterberg
Bad Tales — Damiano and Fabio D'Innocenzo
Black Bear — Lawrence Michael Levine
Falling — Viggo Mortensen
Father (Otac) — Srdan Golubović
Hammamet — Gianni Amelio
Here We Are — 
In the Name of the Land (Au nom de la terre) — Édouard Bergeon
Kala azar — Janis Rafa
Last and First Men — Jóhann Jóhannsson
 (Die Getriebenen) - 
A Metamorphosis of the Birds (A metamorfose dos pássaros) — Catarina Vasconcelos
Mogul Mowgli — Bassam Tariq
My Donkey, My Lover & I (Antoinette dans les Cévennes) — 
My Mexican Bretzel — Nuria Giménez
My Wonderful Wanda (Wanda, mein Wunder) — 
On the Quiet — Zoltán Nagy
The Pencil (Prostoi Karandash) — Natalya Nazarova
The Restoration (La Restauración) — Alonso Llosa
Sarita (Dimmi chi sono) — Sergio Basso
Servants (Sluzobnici) — Ivan Ostrochovsky
The Shepherdess and the Seven Songs (Laila aur satt geet) — Pushpendra Singh
Siberia — Abel Ferrara
Summer of 85 (Été 85) — François Ozon
Tales of the Lockdown (Relatos confinados) — Fernando Colomo, Álvaro Fernández Armero, David Marqués, Miguel Bardem, Juan Diego Botto
There Is No Evil (Sheytan vojud nadarad) — Mohammad Rasoulof
This Is My Desire (Eyimofe) — Arie & Chuko Esiri
Uncle (Onkel) — Frelle Petersen
Undine — Christian Petzold
Yalda, a Night for Forgiveness — Massoud Bakhshi
Yellow Sunglasses (Gafas amarillas) — Iván Mora Manzano

True North
Akilla's Escape — Charles Officer
An Awkward Balance — David Milchard
Beans — Tracey Deer
Brother, I Cry — Jessie Anthony
Call Me Human (Je m'appelle humain) — Kim O'Bomsawin
Chained — Titus Heckel
Events Transpiring Before, During and After a High School Basketball Game — Ted Stenson
First We Eat — Suzanne Crocker
Flowers of the Field — Andrew Stanley
Happy Place — Helen Shaver
Inconvenient Indian — Michelle Latimer
John Ware Reclaimed — Cheryl Foggo
The Magnitude of All Things — Jennifer Abbott
Monkey Beach — Loretta Todd
My Salinger Year — Philippe Falardeau
Nadia, Butterfly — Pascal Plante
No Ordinary Man — Aisling Chin-Yee, Chase Joynt
The New Corporation: The Unfortunately Necessary Sequel — Joel Bakan, Jennifer Abbott
No Visible Trauma — Marc Serpa Francoeur, Robinder Uppal
Pink Lake — Emily Gan, Daniel Schachter
Prayer for a Lost Mitten (Prière pour une mitaine perdue) — Jean-François Lesage
Saint-Narcisse — Bruce LaBruce

Gateway
A Life Turned Upside Down: My Dad's an Alcoholic — Kenji Katagiri
Beauty Water — Cho Kyung-hun
Dancing Mary — Sabu
Memories to Choke on, Drinks to Wash Them Down — Leung Ming-kai, Kate Reilly
Mickey on the Road — Lu Mian Mian
Moving On — Yoon Dan-bi
My Prince Edward — Norris Wong
Shanghai Swings — Yang Mingteng
The Town of Headcounts — Shinji Araki
Twilight's Kiss (Suk Suk) — Ray Yeung

Altered States
The Curse of Willow Song — Karen Lam
Jumbo — 
Lapsis — Noah Hutton
Sanzaru — Xia Magnus
Special Actors — Shin'ichirô Ueda
Violation — Madeleine Sims-Fewer, Dusty Mancinelli

Impact
Caught in the Net — Barbora Chalupová, Vít Klusák
Citizen Penn — Don Hardy
Cured — Bennett Singer, Patrick Sammon
The Forum — Marcus Vetter
The Hidden Life of Trees (Das geheime Leben der Bäume) — Jörg Adolph
I Am Not a Hero — Pablo Crutzen, Robin Smit, Stijn Deconinck
The Reason I Jump — Jerry Rothwell
Women in Blue — Deirdre Fishel

Insights
Anerca, Breath of Life — Johannes Lehmuskallio, Markku Lehmuskallio
Into the Storm — Adam Brown
Journey to Utopia — Erlend E. Mo
My Voice Will Be With You — Bruno Tracq
Once Upon a Time in Venezuela — Anabel Rodríguez Ríos
The Race to Alaska — Zach Carver
Super Frenchie — Chase Ogden
Time — Garrett Bradley
 —

International Shorts
À la carte — Jay Do
The Book of Ruth — Becca Roth
Destructors — Otis Tree
Empty Places — Geoffroy de Crécy
Flawless — Nathan Franck
Flush — Diego Freitas
Home — Alex von Hofmann
Homeless Home — Alberto Vázquez
The Hunter — Sam McConnell
I Want to Make a Film About Women — Karen Pearlman
Illusione — Lorenzo Quagliozzi
Imelda and Luis — Leonel Chee
In This Land We're Briefly Ghosts — Chen-Wen Lo
Jane — Kathryn Prescott
Little Chief — Erica Tremblay
Malakout — Farnoosh Abedi
Not a Word — Élodie Wallace
Now, Daphne — Johann G. Louis
Of Memories and Madness — Maria Isabel de la Ossa
The Parrot Lady — Michalis Kalopaidis
The Roses of Damascus — Gabriel Gonzalez Guirola, Yasmina Touzani
She — Matt Greenhalgh
Sheep, Wolf and a Cup of Tea — Marion Lacourt
Sin Cielo — Jianna Maarten
To: Gerard — Taylor Meacham
To the Dusty Sea — Héloïse Ferlay
The Twins — Cru Bannon, Douglas Ho, Yuriz Joe
Union County — Adam Meeks
Wade — Upamanyu Bhattacharyya, Kalp Sanghvi
White Eye — Tomer Shushan
Widowers — Julian Tuna
The Winter — Xin Li
A Woman — Tahmina Rafaella

M/A/D
Frida Kahlo — Ali Ray
In the Tracks of - Special Edition — Pascale Cuenot
Jimmy Carter: Rock & Roll President — Mary Wharton
Maguy Marin: Time to Act — David Mambouch
Marcel Duchamp: The Art of the Possible — Matthew Taylor
My Rembrandt — Oeke Hoogendijk
Paris Calligrammes — Ulrike Ottinger

Modes
All, or Nothing at All — Persijn Broersen, Margit Lukács
Becoming Alluvium — Thảo Nguyên Phan
Bittersweet — Sohrab Hura
A Demonstration — Sasha Litvintseva, Beny Wagner
Digital Funeral: Beta Version — Sorayos Prapapan
The End of Suffering (a proposal) — Jacqueline Lentzou 
(e)scape goat — Sid Iandovka
In Times of Deception — Michael Heindl
A Month of Single Frames — Lynne Sachs, Barbara Hammer
Playback — Agustina Comedi

Short Forum
Aniksha — Vincent Toi
The Archivists — Igor Drljaca
As Spring Comes (Comme la neige au printemps) — Marie-Ève Juste
August 22, This Year — Graham Foy
Bad Omen — Salar Pashtoonyar
Benny's Best Birthday — Benjamin Schuetze
Black Forest Sanatorium — Diana Thorneycroft
Boredom — Mashie Alam
Breaking up for the Modern Girl — Sydney Nicole Herauf
Cake Day — Phillip Thomas
Canucks Riot II — Lewis Bennett
Cosmic — Meredith Hama-Brown
Deeper I Go — Michael P. Vidler
êmîcêtôcêt: Many Bloodlines — Theola Ross
Even in the Silence — Jonathan Elliott
Every Day's Like This — Lev Lewis
The Fake Calendar — Meky Ottawa
First Person Shooter — Cole Kush
Foam (Écume) — Omar Elhamy
The Fourfold — Alisi Telengut
Girls Shouldn't Walk Alone at Night  (Les filles ne marchent pas seules la nuit) — Katerine Martineau
The Great Malaise (Le Mal du siècle) — Catherine Lepage
Into Water — Cole Forrest
Laura — Kaayla Whachell
Moon (Lune) — Zoé Pelchat
A New Leash on Life — Daniel Jeffery
Nuxalk Radio — Banchi Hanuse
Parlour Palm — Rebeccah Love
Rag Doll — Leon Lee
Spring Tide — Jean Parsons
Strong Son — Ian Bawa
Succor — Hannah Cheesman
Sunken Cave and a Migrating Bird — Qiuli Wu
Toward You — Meysam Motazedi
The Train Station — Lyana Patrick
The Trip — Mikizi Migona Papatie
tu — Suzanne Friesen
Vaivén — Nisha Platzer
ZOO — Will Niava
This Bright Flash — Rylan Friday

References

External links
Official website (from Internet Archive Wayback Machine, archived during the 2020 festival)
 VIFF 2020 Fast Facts  (from official site)
 Closing release including statistics and official list of award winners

Vancouver
Vancouver
Vancouver
Vancouver International Film Festival